Drew Anthony (born 14 January 1969) is an Australian performer, director, choreographer and producer.  His productions of the hit musicals Grease and Chicago - A Musical Vaudeville recently played to sell-out audiences at Perth's The Royale Theatre at Planet Royale.  He has been commissioned to present three new musical theatre productions in 2023 - Strictly Ballroom, A Chorus Line and Gypsy. 
He was the Director/Choreographer for the 2021 production of The Boy From Oz, starring Ethan Jones as Peter Allen, at Crown Theatre, Perth.  From 2019 to Covid he was the Creative Director for Flash Entertainment in Abu Dhabi.  In 2017 and 2018 he was the Creative Director for Kaleidoscope, Perth's light and illumination festival, before which he spent 6 years as Associate Artistic Director/Producer for David Atkins Enterprises (DAE),. He was the Associate Artistic Director/Producer for the 2017 edition of White Night Melbourne and White Night Ballarat and was the Associate Artistic Director for the Closing Ceremony of the Sydney Olympic Games, the Ceremonies of the 12th Arab Games, Doha 2011, Rugby World Cup 2011, and the 2010 Winter Olympics opening ceremony, in Vancouver. Anthony directed the Sony IFA event in Berlin, Germany and the Olivia Newton-John and Friends charity gala event at the State Theatre in Sydney.

Early life
Anthony was born in Mackay, Queensland, and raised on the Gold Coast with his four brothers and sisters. His mother Kay ran a successful performing arts school and his father Bryan the manager of the Queensland Tourist Bureau in Coolangatta.  At the age of 4, he had his first dance lesson. During his childhood years, and while a student at Currumbin SPS and later Palm Beach Currumbin State High, he performed in many musicals for the local Spotlight Theatre Company and won numerous trophies and awards in local dance competitions. Anthony gained notoriety when, in 1984, he won the Fred Astaire International Jazz and Tap Championship in New York City in both the tap and jazz finals for his age group. This experience was the beginning of his love affair with New York City and cemented his passion for musical theatre.

Career

Early career
While still a student in Queensland, and in his early teens, Anthony sang, danced and acted in a number of concerts, corporate shows and local theatre restaurants. At 16 years old, he was given an opportunity to join the famous Regmat Productions in Australia's (then) only casino, Wrest Point Hotel Casino in Hobart, Tasmania, as a dancer. After six months he returned to Queensland and immediately received a phone call from the producers of the J.C. Williamson production of Me and My Girl (directed by Mike Ockrent) offering him, without audition, an ensemble role for the Australian tour on the recommendation of Australian showbusiness legend Sheila Bradley, with whom he had performed a few years earlier in Brisbane.

Performer
After finishing his contract with Me and My Girl, Drew was cast in a succession of Australian musical theatre productions including the original Australian production of Cats (musical), Rasputin, 42nd Street (musical) and Hot Shoe Shuffle. He was a member of the notorious Pardon Me Boys with Ignatius Jones and made regular appearances on variety television programs Midday, Good Morning Australia and Mornings with Kerri-Anne. He has appeared in Home and Away, Dirtwater Dynasty, Logie Awards, Royal Command Performances and worked on the Kennedy Miller hit feature film Happy Feet. He continues to perform and recently played The Narrator in Stephen Sondheim's Putting it Together.

Choreographer
Anthony's choreographic credits include the Australian musicals The Boy From Oz, Jolson, Buddy - The Buddy Holly Story and the world premiere of the West End theatre musical Jailhouse Rock: The Musical and the John Williamson (singer) Australian folk musical Quambatook (which costarred his son, Benson). He choreographed Orpheus in the Underworld for Opera Australia, segments of Red Hot and Rhonda for Rhonda Burchmore and Young Judy for Rachael Beck.

Director
Anthony was the Creative Director/Producer for the NRL State of Origin, the World Handball Championships in Doha, Qatar and was the Associate Artistic Director for the Gold Coast Flag Handover Ceremony at the Glasgow Commonwealth Games.  He directed the Sony IFA event in Berlin, Germany and the Olivia Newton-John and Friends charity gala event at the State Theatre in Sydney. The night raised money for the Olivia Newton-John Cancer and Wellness Centre Appeal.
The line-up included Christine Anu, Carl Barron, Daryl Braithwaite, Kate Ceberano, Tim Freedman, Mark Gable (The Choirboys), Todd McKenney, Ian Moss, Paulini, James Reyne, Guy Sebastian and the Brent Street Dancers along with the 25-piece Symphony Orchestra.

In June 2008, Anthony wrote and directed A Musical Send Off, an all-star concert to benefit the Australian Paralympic Team, which raised over $100,000. A critic wrote:

"If any of the other charity benefits that hit Sydney each year wanted to really learn how to do a benefit properly, organisers should have been well and truly present last night at the Capitol Theatre for the spectacular A Musical Send Off, a charity benefit to assist the Paralympic team go to Beijing later in the year."

Anthony has directed Chicago - A Musical Vaudeville, Grease, The Boy From Oz,  Disney's High School Musical, Carlotta's KingsX and A Very PBC Christmas.

Anthony served as associate director on the Australian national tours of Pirates of Penzance, Me and My Girl, Jolson (Mo Award Nomination), 42nd Street, Singin' in the Rain and the US and UK tours of Hot Shoe Shuffle.'

Anthony has worked on countless corporate and large-scale events, both in Australia and overseas. He was Associate Director of the Closing Ceremony for the Sydney 2000 Summer Olympics and in 2006 relocated to Doha, Qatar, as the Associate Artistic Director of the largest entertainment event staged in the world, the 2006 Asian Games. He was the Associate Artistic Director for the Opening and Closing Ceremonies of the Winter Olympics, Vancouver 2010.

Other
Anthony appeared as the Australian Olympic team mascot at the Seoul 1988 Summer Olympics
– recreated the famous 'Dancin Man' character to lead the VP Day Parade through the streets of Sydney
– received a Mo Award nomination for 'Achievement in Musical Theatre'
– taught 5,000 people, in Melbourne's Federation Square, the famous Gene Kelly routine from Singin' in the Rain to open the 2003 'Dancin in the Streets' arts festival.

References

1969 births
Australian male soap opera actors
Australian male stage actors
Australian choreographers
People from Mackay, Queensland
Living people
Male actors from the Gold Coast, Queensland